Şenol Fidan  (born 29 January 1967) is a former Turkish footballer and currently coach.

Career

Player
Fidan had begun playing football in Boluspor.  He joined Beşiktaş in 1988, in which he played for 5 seasons and won numerous trophies.  He played as a playmaker in midfield.  Later years he lost his placed to Mehmet Ozdilek and than transferred to Gaziantepspor in 1993.

Coaching
Started his managerial career with Kahramanmaraşspor in 2007.  In 2011, he was appointed as coach assistant of Mehmet Özdilek at Antalyaspor. He later became the coach assistant of Mehmet Özdilek successively at Gençlerbirliği (2013-2014), Çaykur Rizespor (2014) and Kayseri Erciyesspor (2015).

Honours
 Beşiktaş
Turkish League: 3 (1989–90, 1990–91, 1991–92)
 Turkish Cup: 2 (1988–89, 1989–90)
 Presidential Cup: 2 (988-89, 1991–92)
 TSYD Cup: 3 (1988, 1990, 1991)

References
http://www.mackolik.com/Player/Default.aspx?id=51053

External links
 Footballer profile at TFF

1966 births
Living people
Footballers from Istanbul
Khazar Lankaran FK managers
Beşiktaş J.K. managers
Association football midfielders
Turkish football managers